is a Japanese actor. He has appeared in more than 30 films since 2008. Nagayama has two elder brothers who are also actors: Tatsuya and Eita.

Filmography

Film

Television

References

External links 
 Official blog 

1989 births
Living people
Japanese male film actors